In Christianity, an episcopus vagans (plural episcopi vagantes; Latin for 'wandering bishops' or 'stray bishops') is a person consecrated, in a "clandestine or irregular way", as a bishop outside the structures and canon law of the established churches; a person regularly consecrated but later excommunicated, and not in communion with any generally recognized diocese; or a person who has in communion with them small groups that appear to exist solely for the bishop's sake.

David V. Barrett, in the Encyclopedia of New Religious Movements, specifies that now  are "those independent bishops who collect several different lines of transmission of apostolic succession, and who will happily (and sometimes for a fee) consecrate anyone who requests it". Those described as wandering bishops often see the term as pejorative. The general term for "wandering" clerics, as were common in the Middle Ages, is clerici vagantes; the general term for those recognising no leader is acephali.

The Oxford Dictionary of the Christian Church mentions as the main lines of succession deriving from episcopi vagantes in the 20th century those founded by Arnold Mathew, Joseph René Vilatte and Leon Chechemian. Others that could be added are those derived from Aftimios Ofiesh, Carlos Duarte Costa, Paolo Miraglia-Gulotti, Emmanuel Milingo, Pierre Martin Ngô Đình Thục and Richard Williamson.

History
According to Buchanan, "the real rise of the problem" happened in the 19th century, in the "wake of the Anglo-Catholic movement", "through mischievous activities of a tiny number of independently acting bishops". They exist worldwide, he writes, "mostly without congregations", and "many in different stages of delusion and fantasy, not least in the Episcopal titles they confer on themselves"; "the distinguishing mark" to "specifically identif[y]" an episcopus vagans is "the lack of a true see or the lack of a real church life to oversee".

Paul Halsall, on the Internet History Sourcebooks Project, did not list a single church edifice of independent bishops, in a 1996–1998 New York City building architecture survey of religious communities, which maintain bishops claiming apostolic succession and claim cathedral status but noted there "are now literally hundreds of these '', of lesser or greater spiritual probity. They seem to have a tendency to call living room sanctuaries 'cathedrals';" those buildings were not perceived as cultural symbols and did not meet the survey criteria. David V. Barrett wrote, in A Brief Guide to Secret Religions, that "one hallmark of such bishops is that they often collect as many lineages as they can to strengthen their Episcopal legitimacy—at least in their own eyes" and their groups have more clergy than members.

Barrett wrote that leaders "of some esoteric movements, are also priests or bishops in small non-mainstream Christian Churches"; he explains, this type of "independent or autocephalous" group has "little in common with the Church it developed from, the Old Catholic Church, and even less in common with the Roman Catholic Church" but still claims its authority from apostolic succession.

Buchanan writes that based the criteria of having "a true see" or having "a real church life to oversee", the bishops of most forms of the Continuing Anglican movement are not necessarily classified as vagantes, but "are always in danger of becoming such".

Theological issues
A Roman or Eastern Catholic ordained to the episcopacy without a mandate from the Pope is automatically excommunicated and is thereby forbidden to celebrate the sacraments, according to canon law. Through the concept of "valid but illicit" ordinations however, and the dogma of sacramental character, though excommunicated and forbidden to celebrate sacraments within any church in communion with the Holy See, the person still holds a valid episcopacy though unrecognized at large.

According to a theological view affirmed, for instance, by the International Bishops' Conference of the Old Catholic Church with regard to ordinations by Arnold Mathew, an episcopal ordination is for service within a specific Christian church, and an ordination ceremony that concerns only the individual himself does not make him truly a bishop. The Holy See has not commented on the validity of this theory, but has declared with regard to ordinations of this kind carried out, for example, by Emmanuel Milingo toward Peter Paul Brennan and others, that the Roman Church "does not recognize and does not intend to recognize in the future those ordinations or any of the ordinations derived from them and therefore the canonical state of the alleged bishops remains that in which they were before the ordination conferred by Mr Milingo", thereby recognizing their previous stance as "illicit but valid" clergy prior to Milingo.

Eastern Orthodox
Vlassios Pheidas, on an official Church of Greece site, uses the canonical language of the Eastern Orthodox tradition, to describe the conditions in ecclesial praxis when sacraments, including Holy Orders, are real, valid, and efficacious. He notes language is itself part of the ecclesiological problem.

This applies to the validity and efficacy of the ordination of bishops and the other sacraments, not only of the Independent Catholic churches, but also of all other Christian churches, including the Roman Catholic Church, Oriental Orthodoxy and the Assyrian Church of the East.

Anglican
Anglican bishop Colin Buchanan, in the Historical Dictionary of Anglicanism, says that the Anglican Communion has held an Augustinian view of orders, by which "the validity of Episcopal ordinations (to whichever order) is based solely upon the historic succession in which the ordaining bishop stands, irrespective of their contemporary ecclesial context".

He describes the circumstances of Archbishop Matthew Parker's consecration as one of the reasons why this theory is "generally held". Parker was chosen by Queen Elizabeth I of England to be the first Church of England Archbishop of Canterbury after the death of the previous office holder, Cardinal Reginald Pole, the last Roman Catholic Archbishop of Canterbury. Buchanan notes the Roman Catholic Church also focuses on issues of intention and not just breaks in historical succession. He does not explain whether intention has an ecclesiological role, for Anglicans, in conferring or receiving sacraments.

Particular consecrations
Arnold Mathew, according to Buchanan, "lapsed into the vagaries of an ". Stephen Edmonds, in the Oxford Dictionary of National Biography, wrote that in 1910 Mathew's wife separated from him; that same year, he declared himself and his church seceded from the Union of Utrecht. Within a few months, on 2 November 1911, he was excommunicated by the Roman Catholic Church. He later sued The Times for libel based on the words "pseudo-bishop" used to describe him in the newspaper's translation from the Latin text "", and, lost his case in 1913.

Henry R.T. Brandreth wrote, in Episcopi Vagantes and the Anglican Church, "[o]ne of the most regrettable features of Mathew's episcopate was the founding of the Order of Corporate Reunion (OCR) in 1908. This claimed to be a revival of Frederick George Lee's movement, but was in fact unconnected with it". Brandreth thought it "seems still to exist in a shadowy underground way" in 1947, but disconnected. Mathew questioned the validity of Anglican ordinations and became involved with the OCR, in 1911 according to Edmonds, and he openly advertised his offer to reordain Anglican clergy who requested it. This angered the Church of England.

In 1912, D. J. Scannell O'Neill wrote in The Fortnightly Review that London "seems to have more than her due share of bishops" and enumerates what he refers to as "these hireling shepherds". He also announces that one of them, Mathew, revived the OCR and published The Torch, a monthly review, advocating the reconstruction of Western Christianity and reunion with Eastern Christianity. The Torch stated "that the ordinations of the Church of England are not recognized by any church claiming to be Catholic" so the promoters involved Mathew to conditionally ordain group members who are "clergy of the Established Church" and "sign a profession of the Catholic Faith". It stipulated Mathew's services were not a system of simony and given without simoniac expectations. The group sought to enroll "earnest-minded Catholics who sincerely desire to help forward the work of [c]orporate [r]eunion with the Holy See". Nigel Yates, in Anglican Ritualism in Victorian Britain, 1830-1910, described it as "an even more bizarre scheme to promote a Catholic Uniate Church in Britain" than Lee and Ambrose Lisle March Phillipps de Lisle's Association for the Promotion of the Unity of Christendom. It was editorialized by O'Neill that the "most charitable construction to be placed on this latest move of Mathew is that he is not mentally sound. Being an Irishman, it is strange that he has not sufficient humor to see the absurdity of falling away from the Catholic Church in order to assist others to unite with the Holy See". Edmonds reports that "anything between 4 and 265 was suggested" as to how many took up his offer of reordination.

When it declared devoid of canonical effect the consecration ceremony conducted by Archbishop Pierre Martin Ngô Đình Thục for the Carmelite Order of the Holy Face group at midnight of 31 December 1975, the Holy See refrained from pronouncing on its validity. It also made the same statement with regard to later ordinations by those bishops, saying that, "as for those who have already thus unlawfully received ordination or any who may yet accept ordination from these, whatever may be the validity of the orders, the Church does not and will not recognise their ordination, and will consider them, for all legal effects, as still in the state in which they were before, except that the ... penalties remain until they repent".

A similar declaration was issued with regard to Archbishop Emmanuel Milingo's conferring of episcopal ordination on four men - all of whom, by virtue of previous Independent Catholic consecrations, claimed already to be bishops - on 24 September 2006: the Holy See, as well as stating that, in accordance with Canon 1382 of the Code of Canon Law, all five men involved incurred automatic excommunication through their actions, declared that "the Church does not recognise and does not intend in the future to recognise these ordinations or any ordinations derived from them, and she holds that the canonical state of the four alleged bishops is the same as it was prior to the ordination". 

Consecrations that the late Archbishop Marcel Lefebvre performed in 1988 for the service of the relatively numerous followers of the Traditionalist Catholic Society of St. Pius X that he had founded, and of the bishops who, under pressure from the Catholic Patriotic Association, "have been ordained without the Pontifical mandate and who have not asked for, or have not yet obtained, the necessary legitimation", and who consequently, Pope Benedict XVI declared, "are to be considered illegitimate, but validly ordained".

Notes and references

Notes

References

Further reading 
 Episcopi Vagantes in Church History. A.J. Macdonald.  London: Society for Promoting Christian Knowledge, 1945. Project Canterbury 
 Episcopi Vagantes and the Anglican Church (1947, 1961) Project Canterbury
 Bishops at Large. Peter Anson. New York City: October House Publishing, 1963.
 Independent Bishops: An International Directory, edited by Gary L. Ward, Bertil Persson, and Alan Bain. Apogee Books, 1990
 The Priesthood Renewed: The Personal Journey of a Married Priest, by Archbishop Emmanuel Milingo, HSA Publications, New York, 2005.

Bishops by type
Episcopacy in the Catholic Church